Lowell Hayes Harrison (October 23, 1922 – October 12, 2011) was an American historian specializing in Kentucky. Harrison graduated from College High (Bowling Green, Kentucky). He received a B.A. from Western Kentucky University in 1946, then enrolled at New York University where he earned an M.A. in 1947 and a PhD in 1951, both in history. He then attended the London School of Economics on a Fulbright Scholarship.

His first regular teaching position was at West Texas State College as an associate professor. By 1957, he was head of their history department. Eventually, Harrison became chair of the College of Social Sciences at West Texas.

In 1967, Harrison returned to Western Kentucky University as professor of history and graduate advisor. In 1979 he was named university historian. He retired from teaching in 1988.

Harrison was a veteran of World War II. He died on October 12, 2011.

Books published
Harrison has authored 115 articles and 11 books, including:

The Civil War in Kentucky
Kentucky's Road to Statehood
A New History of Kentucky (co-author)
Western Kentucky University
Lincoln of Kentucky
The Government of Confederate Kentucky

Notes

1922 births
2011 deaths
Alumni of the London School of Economics
New York University alumni
American historians
Historians of the American Civil War
Western Kentucky University alumni
Western Kentucky University faculty
Writers from Bowling Green, Kentucky
American expatriates in the United Kingdom
American military personnel of World War II
Fulbright alumni